Ralph Mitchell Bernard  (born 11 February 1953) is a British journalist, and a former chief executive of commercial radio group GCap Media.

Early life
He attended Caterham High School in north-east London.

Career
He started his career as a journalist at Sheffield's Radio Hallam in 1975, before moving to Hereward Radio in Peterborough.

In 1982 he moved south to launch Wiltshire Radio as programme director, becoming managing director in 1983.  From here, he helped develop the GWR radio group which later merged with Capital Radio to form the biggest commercial radio company in the UK, GCap Media.  He was chief executive of GWR Group PLC between 1987 and 2001, when he was appointed Executive Chairman. GCap Media's portfolio includes Classic FM and London's Capital Radio.

He was appointed a Fellow of The Radio Academy in 1998.
, he won the Sony Gold Award in 2000 for his contribution to the radio industry and was appointed a CBE for his services to broadcasting in 2002.  He left GCap in March 2008 to be replaced by Fru Hazlitt.

He is chair of the Broadcast Journalism Training Council (BJTC), a partnership between the major broadcasters, the National Union of Journalists (NUJ) and academics who teach broadcast and multimedia journalism.

Personal life
He is married with four children and lives in Wiltshire. He was awarded the CBE in the 2002 Birthday Honours.

References

1953 births
British chief executives
British company founders
British radio executives
British radio journalists
Commanders of the Order of the British Empire
GCap Media
Living people